81 KRH 71 Y (81 mm kranaatinheitin malli 1971 ympäriampuva, '81 mm mortar model 1971, 360-degree traverse') is a light mortar manufactured by Tampella for use by the Finnish Army. It is usually used to support the infantry by indirect fire, but it can also be used for direct fire. Each Finnish infantry company has a platoon of 81 mm mortars. The mortar platoon consists of three seven-man mortar squads, each squad manning a single 81 mm mortar. Jaeger Company M2005 has a fire support squad, which consists of two five-man mortar teams, both equipped with an 81 mm mortar. It can fire HE-fragmentation, smoke, illumination and practice rounds.

Tampella also manufactured a static installed 81 KRH 71 RT (81 mm kranaatinheitin malli 1971 rannikkotykistö, '81 mm mortar model 1971, coastal artillery') for use in the Finnish coastal artillery fortresses.

A newer version of the 81 KRH 71 Y with an improved baseplate made by Vammas is called the 81 KRH 96 (81 mm kranaatinheitin malli 1996, '81 mm mortar model 1996'). The baseplate is designed by scaling down the baseplate of the 120 KRH 92.

References

External links

 Finnish Army site on 81 mm mortar  (in Finnish)

Tampella
Infantry mortars
Mortars of Finland
81mm mortars
Military equipment introduced in the 1970s